Roentgen stereophotogrammetry (RSA) is a highly accurate technique for the assessment of three-dimensional migration and micromotion of a joint replacement prosthesis relative to the bone it is attached to. It was introduced in 1974 by Göran Selvik.

Several studies have found implant migration to be predictive of long-term implant survival and, for most devices, measurement over 2 years might therefore provide a surrogate outcome measure with relatively low numbers of subjects, e.g. from 15 to 25 patients in each group in randomized studies. A smaller number of subjects can be used in these studies as a consequence of the high accuracy of the measurement technique. Because of this, RSA is an important technique in early clinical trials for screening new joint replacement prostheses.

Methodology
To achieve the high accuracy, the following steps are carried out: Small radio opaque markers are introduced in the bone and attached to the prosthesis to serve as well-defined artificial landmarks. Two synchronised x-ray foci are used to obtain a stereo image of the bone and the prosthesis. The positions of the foci are assessed using a calibration object that holds tantalum markers at accurately known positions. The coordinates of the bone and prosthesis markers are accurately measured and the three-dimensional position of the markers is reconstructed using software. The change in the position (translation and rotation) of the prosthesis markers relative to the bone markers is then determined. The reported accuracy of RSA ranges between 0.05 and 0.5 mm for translations and between 0.15˚ and 1.15˚ for rotations (95% confidence interval). New RSA techniques that avoid the need for attaching markers to the prosthesis have been introduced.

See also
 Roentgen radiation
 Stereophotogrammetry
 Dynamic Roentgen stereophotogrammetry

References

External links 
 Digital Roentgen Stereophotogrammetry: Development, Validation, and Clinical Application

Prosthetics
Medical imaging